Guillotière Cemetery is the name of two adjacent but associated cemeteries in Lyon, France. The two cemeteries are distinguished according to when they were built: the new cemetery was built in 1854 and the old cemetery in 1822. They are situated in the La Guillotière neighborhood of the city, in the 7th and 8th arrondissements, just south of Parc Sergent Blandan. They were built to address the shortage of burial spaces in the city. The old cemetery is just north of the new cemetery, and the two are separated by Avenue Berthelot and the railroad tracks connecting Perrache and Part-Dieu railway stations.

History 
Before the end of the 17th century only small church cemeteries existed in Lyon. In 1695 a cemetery named "Cimitière de la Madeleine" was built to accommodate the dead from Hôtel-Dieu de Lyon. In 1807 Cimetière de Loyasse was built on Fourvière hill. These new cemeteries still did not provide enough space for the rapidly growing city, and Guillotière Cemetery was meant to alleviate the growing need for more burial spaces.

The development of Guillotière Cemetery had first been proposed on 1 March 1795 to be built at "Clos Macors", in the commune of La Guillotière, but the cemetery didn't open until 1822. When La Guillotière amalgamated with Lyon in 1852, it became the main cemetery in the city of Lyon. Despite the additional land, by 1854 the space again proved to be insufficient so the new cemetery was constructed to provide additional space for burials.

The cemetery sustained significant damage when it was mistakenly bombed by the American military during the Second World War on 26 May 1944. There is still visible damage on some of the graves at the south end of the new cemetery near rue Pierre Delore.

Design 

, the two cemeteries together contained around 40,000 tombs.

A square of child graves, that includes 80 mini crypts, was constructed in 2015 with support from the Hospices Civils de Lyon and the city of Lyon. This construction was to create space after a similar square built in 2009 reached its capacity.

The two cemeteries are separated by Avenue Berthelot and the railroad tracks connecting Perrache and Part-Dieu railway stations.

Notable interments 
Several notable people are buried at the cemetery, including:
 Painter , died 13 September 1886
 Automobile manufacturer , died 17 April 1949
 Restaurateur and philanthropist , died 3 March 1940
 Pilot Élisabeth Boselli, died 25 November 2005
 Author , died 16 November 1931
 Politician Jules Brunard, died 25 July 1910
 Politician , died 14 October 1958
 Architect , died 14 November 1876
 Checkers player , died 30 March 1985
 Soldier , died 19 September 1892
 Actor Georges Grey, died 2 April 1954
 Professor and Nobel Prize in Chemistry winner Victor Grignard, died 13 December 1935
 Politician , died 16 August 1894
 Cinématographe inventors Auguste and Louis Lumière, died 10 April 1954 and 6 June 1948 respectively (buried in location A6 in the new cemetery)
 Pilot and founding director of Air France , died 4 October 1971
  founder 
 Television host Jacques Martin, died 2007
 General officer , died 4 January 1845
 Radio and television host , died 23 May 2006
 French ophthalmologist Ferdinand Monoyer, died 11 July 1912
 Inventor , died 24 January 1907
 Circus family Rancy
 Sculptor , died 13 December 1876
 Free French Air Forces pilot , died 22 May 1999
 Sculptor Jean Verschneider, died 1943
 Self-proclaimed prophet , died 7 December 1875

Gallery

See also 
 List of cemeteries in France

References

External links 

  
  
  

Cemeteries in Lyon
7th arrondissement of Lyon
8th arrondissement of Lyon
1854 establishments in France
1822 establishments in France
Cemeteries established in the 1820s